True as Steel may refer to:

 True as Steel (album), a 1986 album by Warlock
 True as Steel (film), a 1924 drama film directed and written by Rupert Hughes